James Summers Forrester (January 8, 1937 – October 31, 2011) was a Republican member of the North Carolina General Assembly representing the state's forty-first senate district, including constituents in Iredell, Gaston and Lincoln counties. A physician from Stanley, North Carolina, Forrester died while serving his eleventh term in the state senate, in which he also served as Deputy President Pro Tempore.

Personal life
Forrester was born in Aberdeen, Scotland, the son of Jim Forrester a professional golfer. His father died in 1938 when his son was 18 months old. Forrester graduated from New Hanover High School in 1954. Forrester earned a bachelor's degree in science from Wake Forest University in 1958 and his medical degree from the Bowman Gray School of Medicine in 1962 and a Master's in Public Health from the University of North Carolina at Chapel Hill in 1978. On March 12, 1960, he married Mary Frances All; together they had four children. Forrester also served in the North Carolina Air National Guard, and participated in the Vietnam War as a flight physician. Forrester also ran a private practice for family medicine in Gaston County, North Carolina. Forrester died on October 31, 2011, at age of 74.

Political career
Forrester was elected as Gaston County commissioner in 1982. In 1990, he was elected into the North Carolina State Senate.

He gained notoriety when he became the chief sponsor of Senate Bill 514 which would amend the state constitution to ban same-sex marriages in North Carolina in 2011. He had introduced this amendment at every session since 2004. After the Republicans won control of the General Assembly, Forrester's amendment eventually passed both houses. The proposed amendment to the constitution will appear on the state's 2012 primary ballot.

Forrester came under fire for allegedly misrepresenting his medical credentials. He claimed to be a member of the American Medical Association, a fellow of the American College of Preventive Medicine and an associate fellow of the Aerospace Medical Association. The ACPM revealed that Forrester was not a member of the ACPM, let alone a fellow. Later that day, Laura Leslie of WRAL-TV in Raleigh learned that Forrester was not an associate fellow of the Aerospace Medical Association either. The next day, Leslie reported that Forrester was not a member of the American Medical Association. Senator Forrester's response to this was, "If there's anything falsified on my records it was inadvertently done." He added, "The gay and lesbian community is looking for anything they can to discredit me."

References

External links
 

|-

|-

|-

1937 births
2011 deaths
United States Air Force personnel of the Vietnam War
Physicians from North Carolina
Republican Party North Carolina state senators
Politicians from Aberdeen
People from Gaston County, North Carolina
Scottish emigrants to the United States
UNC Gillings School of Global Public Health alumni
Wake Forest University alumni
21st-century American politicians
Recipients of the Legion of Merit
United States Air Force generals
United States Air Force Medical Corps officers
North Carolina National Guard personnel